Sergio José Bastida (born 3 September 1979 in Rawson, Chubut) is an Argentine-born Bolivian football player. He currently plays for United Zürich in Switzerland.

References

External links
 Statistics at T-Online.de 
 
 football.ch profile 
 Zürich United profile

1979 births
Living people
People from Rawson, Chubut
Argentine footballers
Bolivian footballers
Argentine expatriate footballers
Bolivian expatriate footballers
FC Zürich players
FC Aarau players
FC Lugano players
FC Wohlen players
SC Kriens players
Swiss Super League players
FK Teplice players
FK Chmel Blšany players
Czech First League players
APEP FC players
Nea Salamis Famagusta FC players
Cypriot First Division players
Club Atlético Huracán footballers
Club Bolívar players
Association football midfielders
Expatriate footballers in the Czech Republic
Expatriate footballers in Cyprus
Expatriate footballers in Switzerland
Bolivian expatriate sportspeople in Switzerland
Bolivian people of Argentine descent
Sportspeople of Argentine descent
Bolivian expatriate sportspeople in Cyprus
Bolivian expatriate sportspeople in the Czech Republic
Argentine expatriate sportspeople in Switzerland
Argentine expatriate sportspeople in Cyprus
Argentine expatriate sportspeople in the Czech Republic